Kodathy is a 1984 Indian Malayalam film directed by Joshiy and produced by Prathapachandran. The film stars Ratheesh, Mammootty, Seema, and Prathapachandran in the lead roles. The film has musical score by Shyam.

Cast
Ratheesh as  Kumar (Kavithas younger Brother)
Mammootty as Chandhran (Karthikas lover)
Seema as Kavitha
Kaviyoor Ponnamma as Venu's mother
Prathapachandran as Police officer
Jalaja as Karthika (Kavithas and Kumars younger sister )
M. G. Soman as Venu Kumars friend 
Sukumari as Saraswathiyamma
T. G. Ravi as Divakaran
Kuthiravattom Pappu as Antony
Jagathy Sreekumar as Vasu
Anju as Minimol
Lalu Alex as Das
KPAC Sunny as Advocate

Soundtrack
The music was composed by Shyam and the lyrics were written by Poovachal Khader.

References

External links
 

1984 films
1980s Malayalam-language films
Films directed by Joshiy